Diospyros sulcata is a tree in the family Ebenaceae. Inflorescences bear up to three flowers. The specific epithet  is from the Latin meaning "grooved", referring to the leaf midrib. D. sulcata is found in southwest India and Borneo.

References

sulcata
Plants described in 1908
Flora of India (region)
Trees of Borneo